Calpain-1 (mu-calpain, calcium-activated neutral protease I) is an enzyme. This enzyme catalyses the following chemical reaction

 Broad endopeptidase specificity

This enzyme belongs to the peptidase family C2.

See also 
 CAPN1

References

External links 
 

EC 3.4.22